Cesare Carpano (died 1528) was a Roman Catholic prelate who served as Bishop of Muro Lucano (1521–1528).

Biography
On 6 September 1521, Cesare Carpano was appointed Bishop of Muro Lucano by Pope Leo X.
He served as Bishop of Muro Lucano until his death in 1528.

References

External links and additional sources
 (for Chronology of Bishops) 
 (for Chronology of Bishops) 

16th-century Italian Roman Catholic bishops
Bishops appointed by Pope Leo X
1528 deaths